Rebekah Tiler (born 13 January 1999) is a former British weightlifter, who (as of April 2018) holds all three British Records in the 69 kg class. She competed at the 2014 Commonwealth Games in Glasgow where she finished fourth. She was the UK's only woman weightlifter at the 2016 Olympics. She has three younger sisters: Lisa, Emily and Sophie.
In 2020 she switched to Powerlifting and broke the British Record on the Squat in the 84 kg class.

Major results

References

External links

1999 births
Living people
English female weightlifters
Sportspeople from Keighley
Sportspeople from Bradford
Weightlifters at the 2016 Summer Olympics
Olympic weightlifters of Great Britain
European Weightlifting Championships medalists
Weightlifters at the 2014 Commonwealth Games
Commonwealth Games competitors for England